The 2008 Four Nations Tournament was the eighth edition of the Four Nations Tournament, an invitational women's football tournament held in China. The venue for this edition of the tournament was Guangdong Olympic Stadium, in the city of Guangzhou.

Participants

Venues

Final standings

Match results

References 

2008 in women's association football
2008
2008 in Chinese football
2008 in Canadian women's soccer
2008 in Finnish football
2008 in American women's soccer
January 2008 sports events in Asia
2008 in Chinese women's sport